Piz Glüschaint is a mountain of the Bernina Range (Alps), on the border between Italy and Switzerland. It lies between the Val Roseg (Graubünden) and the Val Malenco (Lombardy). On its northern side is the Roseg Glacier.

See also
List of mountains of Switzerland

References

External links

 Piz Glüschaint on Hikr

Mountains of the Alps
Alpine three-thousanders
Mountains of Switzerland
Mountains of Italy
Italy–Switzerland border
International mountains of Europe
Mountains of Graubünden
Bernina Range